Anthyllis vulneraria, the common kidneyvetch, kidney vetch or woundwort is a medicinal plant native to Europe. The name vulneraria means "wound healer".

Description
Anthyllis vulneraria reaches  of height. The stem is simple or more often branched. The leaves are imparipinnate, glabrous or with scattered hairs on the upper face and silky hairs on the underside. The petals are yellow in most sub-species, but red in A. vulneraria var. coccinea. Flowering takes place between June and September. The fruit is a legume. The fruits ripening takes place from July to October.

Kidney vetch is the food plant of the small blue butterfly larvae and the leaf miner, Aproaerema anthyllidella.

Distribution and habitat
This plant is sporadic throughout Europe, from Iceland to the Mediterranean, in Asia Minor up to Iran, in North Africa and in Ethiopia. It is naturalized in North America. It prefers the dry grasslands and rocky environments with calcareous soil, up to 3000 m of altitude.

Subspecies
This species includes numerous subspecies (which some authors elevate to the role of separate species). A very incomplete list is as follows:

 A. vulneraria subsp. abyssinica (Sagorski) Cullen
 A. vulneraria subsp. alpestris (Kit.) Asch. et Gr.
 A. vulneraria subsp. baldensis (Kerner) Becker
 A. vulneraria subsp. busambarensis (Lojac.) Pign.
 A. vulneraria subsp. carpatica (Pant.) Nyman
 A. vulneraria subsp. colorata (Juz.) Tzvelev (synonym: Anthyllis colorata Juz.)
 A. vulneraria subsp. forondae (Sennen) Cullen
 A. vulneraria subsp. iberica (W.Becker) Jalas
 A. vulneraria subsp. maura (Beck) Lindb.
 A. vulneraria subsp. polyphylla (D.C.) Nyman
 A. vulneraria subsp. polyphylla (D.C.) Nyman × affinis Brittinger ex Kerner
 A. vulneraria subsp. praepropera (Kerner) Bornm.
 A. vulneraria subsp. praepropera (Kerner) Bornm. × adriatica Beck
 A. vulneraria subsp. pulchella (Vis.) Bornm.
 A. vulneraria subsp. vulneraria L.
 A. vulneraria subsp. vulnerarioides (All.) Arcang.
 A. vulneraria subsp. vulnerarioides (All.) Arcang. × bonjeanii Beck
 A. vulneraria subsp. weldeniana (Rchb.) Cullen
 A. vulneraria subsp. weldeniana (Rchb.) Cullen × tricolor Vukot.
 A. vulneraria subsp. weldeniana (Rchb.) Cullen × versicolor Sagorski
 A. vulneraria subsp. valesiaca (Becker) Guyot

Gallery

References

vulneraria
Medicinal plants of Africa
Medicinal plants of Asia
Medicinal plants of Europe
Flora of Europe
Plants described in 1753
Taxa named by Carl Linnaeus